Oliviero Mascheroni (born June 11, 1914, in Milan) was an Italian professional football player.

His sons Norberto Mascheroni and Riccardo Mascheroni played football professionally (Riccardo played in the Serie A for Varese and Napoli in the 1970s).

1914 births
Year of death missing
Italian footballers
Serie A players
A.C. Milan players
U.C. Sampdoria players
A.S. Roma players
Novara F.C. players
Torino F.C. players
Inter Milan players
Aurora Pro Patria 1919 players
Association football midfielders